The anterior cardinal veins (precardinal veins) contribute to the formation of the internal jugular veins and together with the common cardinal vein form the superior vena cava.

The anastomosis between the two anterior cardinal veins develops into the left brachiocephalic vein.

Additional images

See also
 Posterior cardinal vein

References

External links
 
 Diagram at nature.com

Embryology of cardiovascular system